Evgeni Vladimirovich Malkin (born 31 July 1986) is a Russian professional ice hockey centre and alternate captain for the Pittsburgh Penguins of the National Hockey League (NHL). Nicknamed "Geno", Malkin began his career with his hometown club Metallurg Magnitogorsk, playing for their junior and senior teams. He was then selected second overall in the 2004 NHL Draft by the Pittsburgh Penguins, though an international transfer dispute delayed the start of his NHL career until 2006. 

After his first season with the Penguins Malkin was awarded the Calder Memorial Trophy as the NHL's best rookie. In his second season, he helped lead Pittsburgh to the 2008 Stanley Cup Final and was a runner-up for the Hart Memorial Trophy, awarded to the NHL's most valuable player during the regular season. The following season saw Malkin win the Art Ross Trophy, awarded to the points leader in the NHL and again place second for the Hart Trophy. He and the Penguins again reached the Stanley Cup Final, winning the Stanley Cup championship this time around. Malkin was awarded the Conn Smythe Trophy as most valuable player of the playoffs. In 2012, Malkin was awarded the Hart Trophy and Ted Lindsay Award, awarded to the best player as voted on by the players, after winning the Art Ross Trophy for the second time; his 12-point lead was the largest margin of victory since 1999.

Internationally, Malkin has competed for Russia in two IIHF World U18 Championships and three IIHF World U20 Championships, capturing one gold, two silvers and one bronze medal, as a junior. In 2006, in addition to a silver medal, he was also named tournament MVP. As a senior, he has played in four IIHF World Championships, winning the gold medal and being named the tournament MVP for the 2012 event. In addition he has won the bronze medals in two other World Championships and has played for team Russia during three Winter Olympic Games, in Turin, Vancouver and Sochi. In 2020, he was named to the IIHF All-Time Russia Team.

Personal life
Malkin was born on 31 July 1986 in Magnitogorsk to Vladimir and Natalia Malkin. Vladimir worked for Magnitogorsk Iron and Steel Works, the largest iron and steel works in Russia and the city's dominant industry, and played in the Metallurg Magnitogorsk youth and club hockey system. Malkin has one brother, Denis, who is older by one year. Malkin began skating at age three. He joined his first organized hockey league two years later. He showed an aptitude for the sport at an early age, as one might expect from the son of a professional. However, because both of his parents were short, no one suspected Malkin would be a world-class athlete.

Malkin owns a restaurant in Magnitogorsk which is designed to look like the inside of a prison.

Malkin became engaged to Russian television personality Anna Kasterova in November 2015. Six months later on 31 May 2016 their first child, a son was born.

In November 2017, Malkin announced his membership of the PutinTeam social movement, launched by compatriot and fellow NHLer Alexander Ovechkin in support of President of Russia Vladimir Putin during the 2018 Russian presidential election. Malkin stated, "We just try to offer our support because, in 2018, we have the World Cup in Russia; they have elections, too."

Playing career

Early career
Malkin is a product of the Metallurg Magnitogorsk hockey program. Prior to being drafted, he made his Russian Superleague debut in the 2003–04 season as a 17-year-old.  He also made his international debut for Russia during the 2003 U-18 World Championships, where he skated on the top line with Alexander Ovechkin. The team went on to claim the bronze medal.

Transfer dispute
After his first professional season in Russia, Malkin was drafted second overall (behind national teammate Alexander Ovechkin) in the 2004 NHL Entry Draft by the Pittsburgh Penguins. However, a transfer dispute between the NHL and the International Ice Hockey Federation (IIHF) delayed his Pittsburgh debut. On 7 August 2006, it appeared the 20-year-old Malkin had come to a compromise with Metallurg and signed a deal that would have kept him in Russia until May 2007. However, Malkin stated he signed the one-year contract not as a compromise, but because of the immense "psychological pressure" his former club exerted on him. Desiring to play in the NHL, he left Metallurg Magnitogorsk's training camp in Helsinki before it began on 12 August. It would later appear the team had taken Malkin's passport away to prevent him from leaving, but it was eventually given back to him, and Malkin was allowed to pass through Finnish customs. Meeting with his agent, J. P. Barry, the two quickly departed and waited for Malkin's visa clearance from the U.S. Embassy.

In order to legally leave the team, on 15 August, Malkin invoked via fax a law allowing him to cancel his one-year contract by giving his employer two weeks' notice. Having untied himself of obligations in Russia, he was able to sign an entry-level contract with the Penguins on 5 September 2006.

Following his first NHL game with Pittsburgh, on 19 October 2006, Malkin's former Russian hockey club filed an antitrust lawsuit against the NHL and the Penguins in the United States District Court for the southern district of New York. The lawsuit claimed Malkin should not be permitted to play in the NHL because he is still under contract in Russia. The claim also sought unspecified damages as well. The motion for an injunction was denied on 15 November 2006, ensuring Malkin would continue play in the NHL that season. The lawsuit was ultimately dismissed on its merits by the District Court on 1 February 2007.

Pittsburgh Penguins (2006–present)

Early success and first Stanley Cup title (2006–2009)
In his first pre-season game with the Penguins, on 20 September 2006, Malkin collided with teammate John LeClair and dislocated his own shoulder, which forced him to miss the start of the season. Subsequently, his NHL debut would be delayed until 18 October, against the New Jersey Devils, in which he scored his first goal against Martin Brodeur.

Malkin set a modern NHL record when he scored a goal in each of his first six games. No player had achieved this feat since the NHL's inaugural season in 1917–18, when Joe Malone scored at least 1 goal in 14 consecutive games to start his NHL career (Malone, however, had played in the National Hockey Association, the predecessor league to the NHL). Malkin's streak was eventually stopped in his seventh game by the San Jose Sharks.

Playing on a team with another highly touted prospect, Sidney Crosby, Malkin finished his rookie season with 33 goals and 85 points, leading all first-year players and capturing the Calder Memorial Trophy as the NHL's top rookie, the second Penguin to win the award after Mario Lemieux. Malkin was named alternate captain for the Penguins shortly after.

When Malkin arrived in the United States, he spoke little English, but through the help of fellow Russian teammate Sergei Gonchar, he eventually started to give short, simple interviews in the language.

 
In his sophomore season, Malkin recorded his first NHL hat-trick, against the Toronto Maple Leafs, on 3 January 2008. He earned another three-goal performance several games later, on 14 January, against the New York Rangers. Midway through the season, when more heralded teammate and captain Sidney Crosby went down with an ankle injury, Malkin seized the opportunity to lead the Penguins, scoring 44 points in the 28 games Crosby was absent. In total, Malkin completed the season second in NHL scoring with 106 points, six points behind Alexander Ovechkin for the Art Ross Trophy. Malkin continued to dominate into the Stanley Cup playoffs as the Penguins made it to the 2008 Stanley Cup Final. He scored three points against the Detroit Red Wings in the finals, totaling 22 points overall, but the Penguins were defeated by Detroit in six games.

Malkin's sophomore season culminated in a Hart Memorial Trophy nomination as NHL MVP—the award was given to Ovechkin—and First team All-Star honors. On 2 July 2008, with one year left in his entry-level contract, he signed a five-year, $43.5 million contract extension with Pittsburgh.

Malkin began the 2008–09 season by scoring his 200th NHL point with an assist to Sidney Crosby on 18 October 2008. The goal was also Crosby's 100th career goal and 300th career point. Crosby had a team trainer cut the puck in half so both players could commemorate the moment. Voted as a starter to the 2009 NHL All-Star Game later in the season, Malkin won the shooting accuracy segment of the Skills Competition, initially shooting four-for-four before beating Dany Heatley three-for-four in a tie-breaker. After having finished runner-up to Alexander Ovechkin the previous season for the Art Ross Trophy, Malkin captured the scoring championship with 113 points. He became the second Russian-born player to win it, after Ovechkin, and the fourth Penguin, after Mario Lemieux, Jaromír Jágr and Crosby. However, he would once again be runner-up to Ovechkin for the Hart Trophy, although this time garnering a few more first-place votes. In 2008, he had just one first-place vote (out of 134 votes) and 659 points to Ovechkin's 128 first-place votes and 1,313 points. In 2009, Malkin had 12 first-place votes (out of 133 votes) and 787 points to Ovechkin's 115 first-place votes and 1,264 points.

On 12 June 2009, the Penguins won the Stanley Cup after defeating the Detroit Red Wings 2–1 in Game 7 of the Finals. Malkin tallied 36 points (14 goals and 22 assists) to become the first player to lead both the regular season and playoffs in scoring since Mario Lemieux accomplished the feat in 1992. His 36 points were the highest playoff total of any player since Wayne Gretzky amassed 40 points in 1993. Malkin received the Conn Smythe Trophy as playoff MVP, becoming the first Russian-born and Asian-born player to do so. He is also just the second player in franchise history to win both the Art Ross and Conn Smythe trophies in the same year. The other Penguin to accomplish this feat was Hockey Hall of Famer and team co-owner/president Mario Lemieux (1992).

Continued dominance, playoff shortcomings (2009–2015)
On 4 February 2011, after missing five games due to a left knee injury and sinus infection, Malkin returned to play against the Buffalo Sabres. At the start of the second period, Sabres defenceman Tyler Myers collided with Malkin against the end-boards, injuring his right knee. He was helped off the ice and went straight to the dressing room, unable to return to the game as he suffered both a torn anterior cruciate ligament (ACL) and medial collateral ligament (MCL). On 9 February, it was announced Malkin would undergo knee surgery. The Penguins estimated his recovery period as six months, sidelining him for the remainder of the 2010–11 season and playoffs, but stated he should be ready for training camp in September. According to then Penguins' general manager Ray Shero, Malkin sent him a text message after the incident occurred stating, "I'm sorry." In Shero's words, "I told him he had nothing to apologize for."

Malkin had a bounce-back season in 2011–12. With post-concussion syndrome limiting team captain Sidney Crosby to 22 games, Malkin led the Penguins on a line with newly acquired winger James Neal. Despite missing seven games due to lingering effects of his knee surgery, Malkin scored 50 goals for the first time in his career, including three hat-tricks, and won his second scoring title with 109 points. He was the only player in the NHL during the 2011–12 season to score at least 100 points. Malkin would go on to win the Hart Trophy as the NHL's MVP for his performance in the season. He also became the first player in the past ten NHL seasons to win two scoring titles, putting an end to a streak of nine different players over nine seasons leading the NHL in points. Despite Malkin's impressive season, the Penguins were eliminated in the first round of the 2012 playoffs by the Philadelphia Flyers. Malkin scored eight points in the six-game series. Following the Penguins' playoff exit, it was announced Malkin would again represent Russia at the 2012 World Championships.

With the 2012–13 NHL season delayed due to the 2012–13 NHL lockout, Malkin went to Russia and played for Magnitogorsk, his former team, who had joined the Kontinental Hockey League (KHL) since he last played there. By the time the lockout ended in early January, Malkin was second in KHL scoring with 23 goals and 65 points in 37 games. Though he missed the final part of the KHL season, he still finished third overall in scoring. A concussion and shoulder injuries limited Malkin to 31 games during the NHL season, rather than the 48 scheduled, in which he scored 33 points. In the 2013 playoffs, Malkin and the Penguins faced the New York Islanders in the first round, eliminating them in six games. Malkin had an excellent series, recording 2 goals and 11 points in the 6 games. In the next round, the Penguins defeated the Ottawa Senators in five games, with Malkin scoring two more goals and five points. The Penguins were then swept in the conference finals against the Boston Bruins.The entire Penguins team was kept to two goals in the four-game series, with Malkin held off the scoresheet and posting a −5 plus-minus rating.

In the 2013–14 NHL season, Malkin was held out of 22 games, missing two games with a lower body injury on 5 December, nine games with another lower-body injury on 15 December, and then 11 games with a foot injury on 25 March. In the 60 games he was healthy, Malkin scored 72 points, second on the Penguins behind only Sidney Crosby. In his second-to-last game of the season, against the Tampa Bay Lightning, Malkin had two goals and two assists for four points. In the playoffs, the Penguins met the Columbus Blue Jackets in Round 1, eliminating them in six games. Malkin was unable to score for Pittsburgh in the first five games, and only managed four assists in that time, causing Penguins fans to worry, especially since Crosby was being held off the scoresheet as well. But Malkin broke through with a hat-trick in Game 6, propelling his team to Round 2. In Round 2 against the New York Rangers, Malkin and the Penguins were eliminated in seven games, despite holding a 3–1 lead in the series. The Penguins only managed three goals in the last three games. Malkin had a solid series, scoring three goals and seven points in seven games, leading the Penguins.

Back-to-back championships, continued success (2015–present)
Malkin was an integral part of the lineup that helped the Penguins win back-to-back Stanley Cups during the 2015–16 and 2016–17 seasons. He led the 2017 playoffs with 28 points. He also became the 29th player in the history of the NHL to record 150 points in the playoffs.

On 12 March 2019, Malkin scored his 1,000th NHL point, becoming the 88th player in league history to reach the mark.

On 12 July 2022, after initial reports that he would be heading to free agency, Malkin signed a four-year, $24.4 million contract extension to stay with the Penguins. He played his 1,000th NHL game on November 23, 2022, joining Crosby as the only players to play all 1,000 games with the Penguins.

Playing style
Malkin is primarily a centre with very good offensive abilities and decent defensive awareness. He has also been known on rare occasions to play on the wing, and on the point during the power play. He is a good skater with firm balance and above average top speed and agility at the NHL level. In his prime years, Malkin was a physical player who threw big hits and did not shy away from physical contact. He relies on his hockey IQ and athleticism most times to avoid checks by opponents. A very emotionally driven athlete, he has been known to let emotions affect his play both positively and negatively (in the form of taking "bad" penalties). He has an elite arsenal of shots (slap, wrist, backhand, and snap), and has remarkable stick-handling ability. An excellent passer who knows how to open up the game and create space, Malkin is capable of driving the length of the ice to score goals due to his speed, size, and excellent stick handling.

International play

Malkin made his first international appearance with Russia at the 2003 IIHF World U18 Championships in Yaroslavl. He helped Russia to a bronze medal, scoring nine points in six games.  He was named Russia's U18 captain for the 2004 IIHF World U18 Championships the following year and scored eight points as Russia improved to a gold medal in the tournament.

Several months prior to his second and final U18 tournament, Malkin debuted at the under-20 level with Russia at the 2004 World Junior Championships. In his first of three tournament appearances, he contributed five points in six games but could not help Russia reach the podium. The following year, Malkin finished second in team scoring at the 2005 World Junior Championships to Alexander Ovechkin with ten points. Led by the duo of Malkin and Ovechkin (the two had also played together the previous year), Russia won the silver, losing to Canada in the gold medal game. Later in 2005, Malkin made his debut with the Russian men's team at the 2005 World Championships. Despite failing to score a goal in the tournament, Malkin contributed four assists to help Russia to a bronze medal in Vienna.

In 2006, Malkin did triple duty for Russia, competing in his third World Junior Championships, his first Winter Olympics and his second World Championships. He was named the top forward and MVP of the 2006 World Junior Championships in January, captaining Russia to a second straight silver medal and gold medal game loss to Canada. Less than two months later, Malkin was given one of the final spots on Team Russia for the 2006 Winter Olympics in Turin, where he helped the team to a fourth-place finish with six points in seven games. Then in May, Malkin played in the 2006 World Championship, where he led Russia in team scoring with nine points.

Following his NHL rookie campaign with the Pittsburgh Penguins, Malkin was named to the Russia squad for the 2007 World Championships, where he achieved a personal best for the tournament of ten points. Malkin played in the first line of team Russia together with Ilya Kovalchuk and Alexander Frolov. He also captured his second World Championships bronze.

Malkin was selected to play for the Russian Olympic Team at the 2010 Vancouver Olympic Games, where he led Team Russia in points yet again with three goals and six points in four games. Russia ultimately lost to Canada in the quarter-finals, finishing sixth overall, which incidentally is their worst placing ever at an Olympic Games (including the former Soviet Union and Unified Team teams).

Malkin was named MVP, the best forward and to All-Star team at the 2012 IIHF World Championship, where he scored 11 goals and made 8 assists, winning the scoring league with a total of 19 points. He recorded at least one point in every game played. He also had two hat-tricks, against Sweden in the preliminary round and against Finland in the semi-final. Russia won the gold medal.  The 19 points is a new record for Russian players on World Championships.

In 2014, Malkin was named to the 2014 Russian Olympic Ice Hockey Team. He played all five games for Russia as they finished fifth in the tournament after losing to Finland in the quarter-finals. Malkin had one goal and two assists by the end of the tournament.

In 2019, Malkin played in the 2019 IIHF World Championship, where he recorded the primary assist on Russia's game-winning goal against Team USA in the knockout stage. Russia would lose their next game to Finland in the semifinal, and settle for a Bronze medal. 

In 2020, Malkin was named to the IIHF All-Time Russian National Team ahead of Russian and Soviet all-time greats such as Sergei Makarov, Alex Ovechkin, and Sergei Fedorov, among others. The list included both Russian and Soviet legends in honor of the 100 year anniversary of the IIHF World Championships.

Career statistics

Regular season and playoffs

Bold indicates led league

International

Awards and honors

NHL

IIHF

Pittsburgh Penguins team awards

Other awards

Records
 First player since 1917–18 to score goals in each of his first six NHL games (first accomplished by Joe Malone, Newsy Lalonde and Cy Denneny in inaugural NHL season) (18 October – 1 November 2006)
 Longest point streak by a Russian player in the NHL – 15 games (accomplished twice) (surpassed Dmitri Kvartalnov of the Boston Bruins – 14 games in 1992)
 Most consecutive postseason games with multiple points for the Pittsburgh Penguins – 6 games (9–23 May 2009)
 Most playoff points in a single season by a Russian player – 36 (2008–09)
 First Russian player to win the Conn Smythe Trophy (2009)

See also
List of NHL players with 50-goal seasons
List of NHL players with 100-point seasons
List of NHL players with 1,000 points
List of NHL players with 1,000 games played

References

External links

 
 RussianProspects.com Evgeni Malkin Profile

1986 births
Living people
Art Ross Trophy winners
Calder Trophy winners
Conn Smythe Trophy winners
Expatriate ice hockey players in the United States
Metallurg Magnitogorsk players
Hart Memorial Trophy winners
Ice hockey players at the 2006 Winter Olympics
Ice hockey players at the 2010 Winter Olympics
Ice hockey players at the 2014 Winter Olympics
Lester B. Pearson Award winners
National Hockey League All-Stars
National Hockey League first-round draft picks
Olympic ice hockey players of Russia
People from Magnitogorsk
Pittsburgh Penguins draft picks
Pittsburgh Penguins players
Russian expatriate ice hockey people
Russian expatriate sportspeople in the United States
Russian ice hockey centres
Sportspeople from Chelyabinsk Oblast
Stanley Cup champions